Michigan consists of two peninsulas surrounded primarily by four of the Great Lakes and a variety of nearby islands. The Upper Peninsula is bounded on the southwest by Wisconsin, and the Lower Peninsula is bounded on the south by Indiana and Ohio. Both land masses are also separated from the Canadian province of Ontario by waterways of the Great Lakes, and from each other by the Straits of Mackinac. Because its land is largely surrounded by the Great Lakes, which flow into the Saint Lawrence River, Michigan is the only U.S. state whose streams and rivers are almost entirely within the Great Lakes-St. Lawrence watershed.

Michigan's territorial waters include roughly half each of Lake Superior, Lake Michigan, and Lake Huron, and smaller areas of Lake St. Clair and Lake Erie. It includes an estimated 11,000 inland lakes. Its territorial waters are second in area only to those of Alaska. At a total area of  – including those territorial waters – Michigan is the largest state east of the Mississippi River, and the eleventh largest state overall. More than half of the state's land area –  – is still forest.

The state lies roughly between 41° and 49° north latitude, and between 82° and 91° west longitude.

Upper Peninsula

The heavily forested Upper Peninsula is relatively mountainous in the west. The surface on either side of this range is rugged. The peninsula is as large as Connecticut, Delaware, Massachusetts, and Rhode Island combined but has fewer than 330,000 inhabitants.

The geographic orientation of Michigan's peninsulas makes for a long distance between the ends of the state. Ironwood, in the far western Upper Peninsula, lies 630 highway miles (1,015 km) from Lambertville in the Lower Peninsula's southeastern corner. The geographic isolation of the Upper Peninsula from Michigan's political and population centers makes the U.P. culturally and economically distinct.

Lower Peninsula

The surface of the peninsula is generally level, broken by conical hills and glacial moraines usually not more than a few hundred feet tall.

A feature of Michigan that gives it the distinct shape of a mitten is the Thumb. This peninsula projects out into Lake Huron and the Saginaw Bay. The geography of the Thumb is mainly flat with a few rolling hills. The Leelanau Peninsula lies in the Northern Lower Michigan region. See Also Michigan Regions

Great Lakes 

The Great Lakes that form most of the water boundary of Michigan are Lake Erie, Lake Huron, Lake Michigan, and Lake Superior. Because of the historical importance of shipping on the lakes, Michigan has about 150 lighthouses, more than any other state. (see Lighthouses in the United States) The state is bounded on the south by the states of Ohio and Indiana, sharing land and water boundaries with both.

Michigan's northern boundaries are almost entirely water boundaries, from south to north, with Illinois and Wisconsin in Lake Michigan; then a land boundary with Wisconsin and the Upper Peninsula, that is principally demarcated by the Menominee and Montreal Rivers; then water boundaries again, in Lake Superior, with Wisconsin and Minnesota to the west, capped around by the Canadian province of Ontario to the north and east.

The northern boundary then runs completely through Lake Superior, from the western boundary with Minnesota to a point north of and around Isle Royale, thence traveling southeastward through the lake in a reasonably straight line to the Sault Ste. Marie area. In Southeastern Michigan there is a water boundary with Canada along the entire lengths of the St. Clair River, Lake St. Clair (including the First Nation reserve of Walpole Island) and the Detroit River. The southeastern boundary ends in the western end of Lake Erie with a three-way convergence of Michigan, Ohio and Ontario.

With the exception of two tiny areas on its borders – one drained by the Mississippi River by way of the Wisconsin River in the Upper Peninsula, the other by way of the Kankakee-Illinois River in the Lower Peninsula – the rivers and streams of Michigan drain entirely into the Great Lakes.

The larger islands of Michigan include Isle Royale and Grand Island in Lake Superior; Neebish and Sugar islands in the St. Mary's River; Drummond Island, Les Cheneaux Islands, Mackinac Island, Bois Blanc Island, and Charity Island in Lake Huron; Beaver Island, the Fox Islands, North Manitou Island, and South Manitou Island in Lake Michigan; Harsens Island in Lake St. Clair; and Belle Isle and Grosse Ile in the Detroit River.

Keweenaw Bay, Whitefish Bay, and the Big and Little Bay de Noc are the principal bays of the Upper Peninsula. The Grand and Little Traverse, Thunder, and Saginaw bays are found on the Lower Peninsula. After Alaska, Michigan has the longest shoreline of any state, . An additional  can be added if islands are included. This roughly equals the length of the Atlantic Coast from Maine to Florida.

Inland lakes and rivers 

The state has 11,037 inland lakes comprising  of inland water.

The state's numerous rivers are generally short and shallow, though several are navigable by recreational watercraft. The principal ones include the Au Sable, Thunder Bay, Cheboygan, and Saginaw, all of which flow into Lake Huron; the Ontonagon, and Tahquamenon, which flow into Lake Superior; and the St. Joseph, Kalamazoo, Grand, Muskegon, Manistee, and Escanaba, which flow into Lake Michigan.

Protected areas 

Other national protected areas in the state include: Keweenaw National Historical Park, Huron National Forest, Manistee National Forest, Hiawatha National Forest, Ottawa National Forest, Fumee Lake Natural Area, and Father Marquette National Memorial. The largest section of the North Country National Scenic Trail also passes through Michigan.

With 78 state parks, 19 state recreation areas, and 6 state forests, Michigan has the largest state park and state forest system of any state. These parks and forests include Holland State Park, Mackinac Island State Park, Au Sable State Forest, and Mackinaw State Forest.

Climate 

Michigan has a humid continental climate, although there are two distinct regions. The southern third of the Lower Peninsula (south of Saginaw Bay and from the Grand Rapids area southward) have a warmer climate (Köppen climate classification Dfa) with hot summers and cold winters. The northern two-thirds of the Lower Peninsula and the entire Upper Peninsula has a more severe climate (Köppen Dfb), with warm, but shorter summers and longer, cold to very cold winters. Some parts of the state average high temperatures below freezing from December through February, and into early March in the far northern parts. During the winter through the middle of February parts of the state are frequently subjected to heavy lake-effect snow. Snow cover tends to be intermittent in the southern part of the state, but persistent in northern Lower Michigan and especially in the Upper Peninsula.

The entire state averages 30 days of thunderstorm activity per year. These can be severe, especially in the southern part of the state. The state averages 17 tornadoes per year, which are more common in the extreme southern portion of the state. Portions of the southern border have been nearly as vulnerable historically as parts of Tornado Alley. Farther north, in the Upper Peninsula, tornadoes are rare.

Geology 

The geological formation of the state is greatly varied. Primary boulders are found over the entire surface of the Upper Peninsula (being principally of primitive origin), while Secondary deposits cover the entire Lower Peninsula. The Upper Peninsula exhibits Lower Silurian sandstones, limestones, copper and iron bearing rocks, corresponding to the Huronian system of Canada. The central portion of the Lower Peninsula contains coal measures and rocks of the Permo-Carboniferous period. Devonian and sub-Carboniferous deposits are scattered over the entire state.

The soil is of a varied composition and in large areas is very fertile, especially in the south. However, the Upper Peninsula for the most part is rocky and mountainous, and the soil is unsuitable for agriculture. The climate is tempered by the proximity of the lakes and is much milder than in other locales with the same latitude.

Ecology
The principal forest trees include basswood, maple, elm, sassafras, butternut, walnut, poplar, hickory, oak, willow, pine, birch, beech, hemlock, witchhazel, tamarack, cedar, locust, dogwood, and ash.

Notes

References